Alpha Gamma Kappa ( or AGK) is the oldest and largest professional fraternal organization for students and practitioners of podiatric medicine in the United States. The fraternity was founded in 1939 at the Dr. William M. Scholl College of Podiatric Medicine in Chicago, Illinois.

Mission statement
The mission of Alpha Gamma Kappa Podiatric Fraternity is "to promote and perpetuate the profession of podiatric medicine through social, educational, community service, and leadership events, which foster the growth and development of podiatric medical students and physicians."

History
The history of Alpha Gamma Kappa Fraternity lies deep in the roots of our nation’s podiatric medical colleges.  Existing as the oldest and largest professional fraternity within podiatric medicine, AGK has long held a fraternal tradition of excellence.

On January 21, 1939, eight men at Illinois College of Chiropody and Orthopedics (now Dr. William M. Scholl College of Podiatric Medicine) in Chicago, Illinois, founded a fraternity for the purposes of "social spirit and fraternalism."  It was the first of its kind at a college of podiatric medicine, and quickly the small social club grew into one of the most prominent organizations at the institution.

In April, 1939, in the earliest recorded minutes that are possessed, the Alpha Gamma Kappa Fraternity at the Illinois College of Chiropody and Orthopedics had some nineteen members, with Samuel Abdoo elected first president.  Abdoo would later serve as president of the American College of Foot and Ankle Surgeons from 1968 to 1969.  According to the minutes, the young fraternity had $119 in their name and dues were $5 per year.

The fraternity remained a large part of the student community at Illinois for the next several years, until in 1948 a second chapter (Beta) was chartered at the Ohio College of Podiatric Medicine in Cleveland, Ohio.  This chapter was inspired by several students who had met at national convention of the National Association of Chiropodists in that year. This chapter, in recent years has borne a resurgence likely in part to the efforts of recent executive members.

The fraternity saw little growth during the 1950s.  The two chapters of Alpha Gamma Kappa, Alpha and Beta, would occasionally correspond with one another, but for the most part remained separate entities with their own traditions, except for the "Ritual of Initiation," which is still in use, written by the Alpha chapter in 1939. In fall 1961, a third chapter would be chartered at the California School of Podiatric Medicine in San Francisco, California.  This marked the first chapter to be founded on the West Coast.

For the next three decades, Alpha Gamma Kappa Fraternity remained a small yet integral part of the campus community of the colleges at which it existed.  At the Ohio College of Podiatric Medicine it started and maintained a free clinic completely run by students to provide podiatric medical care to the less fortunate in Cleveland.  At Scholl and California, it provided a cornerstone for student social life and grew to be a “vivid social experience” for podiatric medical students.  It was not until 2007 that another chapter would be chartered.  A transfer student from Scholl College to the Barry University School of Podiatric Medicine in Miami, Florida sought to create a fraternal organization at the school that would encourage fraternalism and a kindred spirit amongst a diverse student population.  Through the efforts of many, this dream was realized and on October 2, 2007, the Delta chapter of Alpha Gamma Kappa Fraternity was founded.

Subsequent chapters have been chartered at the Temple University School of Podiatric Medicine in 2008 and the Des Moines University College of Podiatric Medicine and Surgery in 2009, respectively.

In 2013, the Scholl Alpha chapter saw a resurgence in social and fundraising activities. This has mainly been due to a new, enthusiastic executive board led by Neil Ermitano (president) Frank Narcisi (social vice president), and Jeff Stych (academic vice president). Under this new leadership, Alpha Gamma Kappa has raised thousands of dollars to provide care for uninsured patients through Rosalind Franklin University's new Interprofessional Community Clinic. As a result of this recent success, Alpha Gamma Kappa has reestablished themselves as the premiere social fraternity at Rosalind Franklin University.

Government
Since 1939, the Fraternity has functioned as a confederation with chapters being loosely affiliated to one another.  There have been no national officers or convention.  Individual chapters are subordinate to the respective podiatric medical student association at their college or school.

Alpha Gamma Kappa has long been considered the oldest and most prestigious of the podiatric medical fraternities; the other major podiatric medical fraternity being Kappa Tau Epsilon, established at the Ohio College of Podiatric Medicine in 1965.

Symbols and Insignia
The white rose is the official flower of the Fraternity.  Its significance is explained in the pledge ceremony as "the white rose is emblematic of purity and truth, which you shall endeavor to strive for not only as a pledge, but most especially as a member.  Last, but far from least, its beauty and fragrance are symbolic of the real affection and strong abiding friendship which characterize us as sworn brothers, striving together for one common objective and purpose, the promulgation of the philosophy of Alpha Gamma Kappa — a spirit which will improve the world around us, improve the profession of podiatric medicine, and most importantly improve ourselves." Each year chapters hold a formal in the spring, which is referred to as, “White Rose Ball.”

The official jewel of Alpha Gamma Kappa is the white pearl.  It is often used to adorn the Fraternity's badges.

Asclepius, the Greek demigod of medicine and healing holds a special place in Alpha Gamma Kappa tradition and symbolism.  The pledge manual of the Fraternity is named "The Asklepian."  Each year on or nearest November 7, chapters hold a celebration known as "Asclepius Day" with a festive party or event.  Mercury, the Roman God is referred to as the "Patron of Alpha Gamma Kappa."  His winged sandal is a prominent symbol, which is displayed upon the coat-of-arms and the pledge pin.

The official badge of Alpha Gamma Kappa is a diamond of black onyx, trimmed in gold with the Greek letters “ΑΓΚ” appearing in gold and surmounting a skull and crossbones in gold.  Upon the back of the badge is the open motto Pedis Studium. The pledge pin is a triangle of cardinal with the winged foot of Mercury in the center.

The flag of the Fraternity is rectangular in shape and divided into three equal sections.  The first and third sections are cardinal, with the middle section being white.  In the middle section is the coat-of-arms of the Fraternity.  The Alpha Gamma Kappa flag is used only during ritualistic ceremonies and on special occasions.

Awards
The Fraternity's highest and most prestigious award presented by a chapter is the "Pedis Studium Award."  This award is presented to podiatric physicians who are members of the Fraternity and have, in their practice of podiatric medicine, exemplified the principles of Alpha Gamma Kappa through service, education, and leadership and have given themselves of the highest degree to the benefit and perpetuity of podiatric medicine.

Active collegiate chapters
Alpha: Dr. William M. Scholl College of Podiatric Medicine at Rosalind Franklin University
Beta: Ohio College of Podiatric Medicine
Gamma: California School of Podiatric Medicine at Samuel Merritt College
Delta: Barry University School of Podiatric Medicine
Epsilon:  Temple University School of Podiatric Medicine
Zeta:  Des Moines University College of Podiatric Medicine and Surgery

See also
 American Association of Colleges of Podiatric Medicine
 American Podiatric Medical Association (APMA)
 Professional fraternities and sororities

References

Student organizations established in 1939
Professional medical fraternities and sororities in the United States
Medical and health organizations based in California
Education in Lake County, Illinois
Rosalind Franklin University of Medicine and Science
1939 establishments in Illinois